Percy Birch (1860 – unknown) was an English footballer who played for Stoke.

Career
Birch played for Stoke Priory before joining Stoke in 1883. He played in the club's first competitive match in the FA Cup against Manchester where he kept goal in a 2–1 defeat. He stayed at Stoke until the end of the 1885–86 season where he played in two more FA Cup matches. He later went on to play for Cobridge.

Career statistics

References

English footballers
Stoke City F.C. players
1860 births
Year of death missing
Association football goalkeepers